Galowych, Gallowych or Gallouich (rendered as  and ) was a Slavic surname found in Habsburg Latin sources of the 16th and 17th centuries. Bearers were present in present-day Czech Republic, Slovenia and Croatia, and included Iwan, Michel, Andreas, Georgius (colonizer in Prachatice), Nicolaus (colonizer in Tišina), Stephan (colonizer in Savinja), Blasius (in Mraclin), Michael (in Ivanić). Today, the surnames of Galović and Galovič exist in former Yugoslavia.

See also
Gallowitsch, German surname
Galów, settlement in Poland
Galović, settlement in Serbia
Galovići, settlement in Serbia

References

Further reading

Slavic-language surnames